Football Club Gatineau was a Canadian semi-professional soccer club based in Gatineau, Quebec that played in the Première Ligue de soccer du Québec until the 2019 season. It currentlty concentrates its activities on regional development of players.

History 
The club was founded in 1979 under the name Association de Soccer de Hull. Their home field is located at the Mont-Bleu Sports Complex.

In 2013, the club joined the Première Ligue de soccer du Québec, a Division III league, fielding a team in the men's division. In 2014, Gatineau won the League Cup, defeating CS Longueuil 1-0 in the final. They finished as the runner-up for the League Cup for three consecutive seasons in 2016, 2017, and 2018. After a strong 2018 season in which they finished third in the league, they had a disastrous 2019 season, finishing in last place and failing to record a single victory. They left the PLSQ after the 2019 season, after being unable to meet the financial requirements of the league. They instead decided to join the Ontario-based Ottawa-Carlton Soccer League.

In 2016, they became a partner club of the Montreal Impact and in 2017, control of FC Gatineau was transferred from the Outaouais Regional Soccer Association to local club AS Hull (now renamed FC Gatineau as a whole). In 2017, the club played a friendly against the Haiti U20 national team. As of 2020, a potential merger between FC Gatineau and CS Aylmer is in the works.

Seasons

Notable former players
The following players have either played at the professional or international level, either before or after playing for the PLSQ team:

Honours
Première Ligue de soccer du Québec
Coupe PLSQ: 2014

References

Gatineau
Soccer clubs in Quebec
Association football clubs established in 1979
1979 establishments in Quebec
Sport in Gatineau